Nigel Palfreyman (born 2 October 1973) is a former Australian rules footballer who played with the Brisbane Bears and Fitzroy in the Australian Football League (AFL).

Originally from Tasmanian Football League (TFL) club Sandy Bay, Palfreyman was drafted by Brisbane in the 1990 AFL Draft. He played 15 of a possible 24 games in 1992 but didn't make a senior appearance in 1993.

Palfreyman was traded, along with David Bain, to Fitzroy in the 1993 AFL Draft. His only league game for Fitzroy came against Richmond at Western Oval.

References

1973 births
Australian rules footballers from Tasmania
Brisbane Bears players
Fitzroy Football Club players
Sandy Bay Football Club players
Living people